Navezuelas is a municipality located in the province of Cáceres, Extremadura, Spain. According to the 2005 census (INE), the municipality has a population of 740 inhabitants.

References

External links
Web site
Photos
City website
Location (Google-maps)

Municipalities in the Province of Cáceres